The Faim are a four-piece band from Perth, Australia. The band consists of singer Josh Raven, bassist/keyboardist Stephen Beerkens, guitarist Samuel Tye and drummer Linden Marissen. The band released their debut EP Summer Is a Curse in 2018 and have signed an international deal with BMG Rights Management.

History

2014–2017: Formation and recognition 
The band was formed in Perth while some of the group members were still attending high school. They met in their music class and decided to form the band with their previous name being Small Town Heroes. Seven months later Sean joined after they found him on YouTube.

The Faim is managed by Rob Nassif who is a drummer in the band Gyroscope. Rob discovered The Faim in July 2015 where they were rehearsing at the rehearsal studio he owns, The Hen House Rehearsal Studios.

In 2016, the band started to work with John Feldmann, Los Angeles-based producer and lead singer of the band Goldfinger. The band got invited to Los Angeles to make music alongside other producers and songwriters. The band got signed with BMG Rights Management and with the help of Pete Wentz produced their debut single "Saints of the Sinners".

2018–2021: World tours, line-up changes and State of Mind 

At the start of March 2018, The Faim embarked on their first-ever tour. It included 57 shows across 11 weeks playing in 7 different countries including support slots with Lower Than Atlantis across the UK and Sleeping with Sirens and PVRIS across Australia and New Zealand. The band was also invited to perform at the prestigious Download Festival, Slam Dunk Festival, The Great Escape and Liverpool Sound City.

Later in the year, The Faim went on another world tour which included 50 shows across 17 weeks visiting 11 countries. The Faim started out playing at world renowned Reading and Leeds Festival before a three-week promo tour of Germany. The band's single "Summer Is A Curse" made it to #12 on the German radio charts, and got featured in France's Jeep advertisement. They were also the supporting artist for Against the Current during their European Tour.

On August 2, 2018, Michael Bono addressed that he will no longer be part of the band due to allegations made against him. On November 28, 2018, Sean Tighe announced his departure to pursue future projects of drumming.

Shortly after, the band headed back to the US for their first ever US tour supporting Hands Like Houses.

At the beginning of 2019, The Faim announced their first headline world tour playing 31 shows across 13 countries. Reception to the tour was massive, with sold-out shows in the UK, Germany, Netherlands and Australia. From April to May, The Faim completed their second US tour as the main support for Andy Black on his US/Canadian spring tour.

Soon after joining the band, drummer Linden Marissen was ecstatic to announce he was endorsing Pearl Drums.

In May 2019, the band announced their world tour "State of Mind" where they would be performing across cities in Australia, UK and Europe, as well as playing at Lollapalooza Berlin, FM4 Frequency Festival and Reading and Leeds Festival once again.

In September 2019, the band released their debut album State of Mind featuring the singles "Summer Is a Curse", "Amelie" and "Humans". In support of the album, the band underwent their first co-headline tour of the US with Australian pop punk band Stand Atlantic.

2022–present: Talk Talk, The Faim in The Hills, and Album Tour 
On July 8 2022, the band released their sophomore album, Talk Talk featuring the singles "The Hills", "Era", "Ease My Mind", "Me Because of You" and "The Alchemist".

In the weeks leading up to the release of Talk Talk, Josh Raven and Stephen Beerkens posted short interviews on the band's official YouTube under the title "The Faim in "The Hills" where they discussed the past two years they spent making the album.

On May 6, 2022, the band announced their first Australian tour in 3 years in support of the album. The Australian leg started on July 15 in Perth, before travelling to Brisbane, Newcastle, Sydney, Wollongong, Canberra, Melbourne and Adelaide. Bad Weather and TERRA joined The Faim on Australian Tour as the support acts.

Members

Current 
 Josh Raven – lead vocals (2014–present)
 Stephen Beerkens – bass, keyboard, backing vocals (2014–present)
 Samuel Tye – guitar (2019–present)
 Linden Marissen – drums (2019–present)

Former 
 Michael Bono – bass, guitar (2014–2019)
 Sean Tighe – drums, percussion (2015–2019)
 Sean Van Hengel - drums, percussion (2014–2015)

Discography

Studio albums

Extended plays

Singles

Music videos

References

External links

Australian rock music groups
Musical quartets
Musical groups established in 2014
2014 establishments in Australia